A list of the films produced in Mexico in 1989 (see 1989 in film):

1989

See also
1989 in Mexico

External links

1989
Films
Lists of 1989 films by country or language